Bhausaheb Ubale,  (b. 1936 in the Satara district, Maharashtra, India – d. 14 March 2012, Pune, India) was an Indian-born Canadian human rights activist.

Ubale received a Master of Arts degree in 1971 from the University of Leeds and a Ph.D. in 1975 from the University of Bradford.

From 1978 to 1985, he was a Commissioner on the Ontario Human Rights Commission. From 1986 to 1989, he was a Commissioner on the Canadian Human Rights Commission.

He is the author of Equal Opportunity and Public Policy (1978), a report submitted to the Attorney General of Ontario, and Politics of Exclusion: Multiculturalism or Ghettoism (1992).

In 2001, he was awarded the Order of Ontario in recognition of his being "a renowned human rights activist whose work has made Ontario and Canada, a better place to live for people of all backgrounds".

References

 

1936 births
2012 deaths
Indian emigrants to Canada
Alumni of the University of Leeds
Alumni of the University of Bradford
Members of the Order of Ontario
Canadian people of Marathi descent
Canadian human rights activists
Canadian people of Indian descent